René Veenstra (Groningen, October 16, 1969) is a professor of sociology at the University of Groningen, the Netherlands. He is the scientific director of the Interuniversity Center for Social Science Theory and Methodology (ICS). The ICS is a joint graduate school of the sociological departments at the University of Groningen, Utrecht University, Radboud University Nijmegen, and the University of Amsterdam.

Biography 
Veenstra graduated in Educational Sciences and Pedagogy from the University of Groningen in 1994. In 1999 he received his doctorate in Sociology of Education, supervised by Jules Peschar and Tom Snijders. From 2000 to 2004, he worked as a postdoc (with Siegwart Lindenberg and Hans Ormel) and as a data manager at TRAILS. TRAILS is a study that has been following a group of youth in their development since 2001. About 2,500 young people are given questionnaires, interviews, and tests every two years. TRAILS researchers examine their physical, mental, and social development.

He was appointed professor of sociology in 2011. In 2015, he received a 1.5 Million NWO Vici Grant for a research program, titled Anti-bullying programs 2.0: Tailored interventions to minimize bullying.

He is a member of the steering committee of the GUTS (Growing Up Together in Society) research program, funded by the Ministry of Education, Culture, and Science with 22 million euros. This 10-year program (2023-2032) was initiated by Eveline Crone. The program has the ambition to understand how youth grow up in a complex society. GUTS combines social network research with neuropsychology.

Research 
Veenstra examines and directs research on the social development of youth. This line of research examines, for instance, social norms, social influence, social network processes related to bullying, and the healthy context paradox. His line of research uses various analysis techniques, including social network analysis techniques such as stochastic actor-oriented models, as implemented in R Siena a program developed by Tom Snijders and colleagues. His group also collected high-quality datasets, such as SNARE, KiVa NL, and PRIMS.

SNARE 
SNARE (Social Network Analysis of Risk behavior in Early adolescence) is a Dutch adolescent social network dataset with about 1,800 students from two schools: one in the middle and one in the north of the Netherlands. Longitudinal social network studies using SNARE focused on how friends select and influence each other in academic achievement, aggression, and helping.

KiVa NL 
KiVa NL is a dataset collected to evaluate the KiVa anti-bullying intervention in the Netherlands. KiVa was originally a Finnish program and was developed by Christina Salmivalli. The intervention prevents and tackles bullying effectively. KiVa emphasizes the role of the whole group in bullying. Teachers are important for instructing students and breaking the power that bullies have over their classmates. KiVa NL contains about 10,000 students from 98 schools in total. Data collection started in 2012 with a pre-assessment in Grades 2-5 and was followed up every six months for two years, resulting in five waves of data. Longitudinal social network studies using KiVa NL focused on the co-development of, on the one hand, bullying and victimization, and, on the other hand, antipathies, defending, friendships, and popularity.

Recognition 
He was a visiting professor at the Department of Psychology at the University of Turku, Finland (2007-2012). He was an editor of the Journal of Research on Adolescence from 2010 to 2016. He is an elected member of the Royal Holland Society of Sciences and Humanities and an elected fellow of the International Society for the Study of Behavioral Development. He was a keynote speaker at the World Anti-Bullying Forum in 2019. He was the keynote speaker in the Martini Church at the opening of the Academic Year in Groningen in 2022.

References 

1969 births
University of Groningen
University of Groningen alumni
Dutch sociologists
Social network analysis
Living people